Imran Ismail (born 1 January 1966) is a Pakistani businessman and politician from Pakistan Tehreek-e-Insaf. He served as the 33rd Governor of Sindh from 27 August 2018 to 18 April 2022. Before being appointed Governor of Sindh, he was a member of the Provincial Assembly of Sindh for a brief period in August 2018.

Early life and education
He was born on 1 January 1966 in Karachi, Pakistan, into the Delhi Punjabi Saudagaran community.

Political career
He is one of the founding members of the Pakistan Tehreek-e-Insaf (PTI).

He ran for the seat of the National Assembly of Pakistan as a candidate of PTI from Constituency NA-246 (Karachi-VIII) in by-election held in April 2015 but was unsuccessful. He received 24,821 votes and lost the seat to Kunwar Naveed Jamil.

He was elected to the Provincial Assembly of Sindh as candidate of PTI from Constitutuency PS-111 (Karachi-XXIII) in 2018 Pakistani general election.

On 6 August 2018, he was named by Imran Khan as Governor of Sindh. On 11 August 2018, he was formally nominated by PTI for the same office. On 13 August 2018, he took oath as member of the Sindh Assembly. The same day, he reaffirmed the PTI's commitment to demolish the security walls around Karachi's Bilawal House. On 23 August 2018, he was appointed as Governor of Sindh. His appointment as Governor drew criticism from academic experts who claimed Ismail, for being intermediate pass only, does not have the necessary academic qualifications for the office by arguing that Governor office makes him the chancellor of all state-run educational institution. On 27 August 2018, he resigned from his Sindh Assembly seat and took oath as Governor of Sindh. On 18 April 2022, Ismail resigned as Governor of Sindh.

Ismail was injured during the attempted assassination of Imran Khan.

References

Living people
1966 births
Pakistani Muslims
Pakistan Tehreek-e-Insaf politicians
Businesspeople from Karachi
Politicians from Karachi
Sindh MPAs 2018–2023
Governors of Sindh